Noblella is a genus of frogs in the family Strabomantidae. They are found on the eastern slopes of the Andes and in the Amazon Basin in Colombia, Ecuador, Peru, Bolivia, and western Brazil. The name refers to Gladwyn K. Noble, who described the first species.

Taxonomy
The genus Noblella was originally erected to accommodate Sminthillus peruvianus, but subsequently synonymized, first with Eleutherodactylus (1971) and then with Phrynopus (1975). Noblella was resurrected by De la Riva and colleagues in 2008. At the same time, the genus Phyllonastes was placed into synonymy with Noblella. However, Noblella, as currently defined, might still be polyphyletic.

Description
Head is no wider than the body. Tympanic membrane is differentiated except in Noblella duellmani. Dorsum is pustulate or shagreen. Venter is smooth.

Species
The following species are recognised in the genus Noblella:

References

 
Strabomantidae
Amphibians of South America
Amphibian genera
Taxa named by Thomas Barbour